Horowitzian is an eponymous adjective and may refer to:

Vladimir Horowitz (1903–1989), Russian-American classical virtuoso pianist
Donald L. Horowitz, professor of law and political science